Cosmos: A Personal Voyage is a thirteen-part, 1980 television series written by Carl Sagan, Ann Druyan, and Steven Soter, with Sagan as presenter. It was executive-produced by Adrian Malone, produced by David Kennard, Geoffrey Haines-Stiles, and Gregory Andorfer, and directed by the producers, David Oyster, Richard Wells, Tom Weidlinger, and others. It covers a wide range of scientific subjects, including the origin of life and a perspective of our place in the universe. Owing to its bestselling companion book and soundtrack album using the title, Cosmos, the series is widely known by this title, with the subtitle omitted from home video packaging. The subtitle began to be used more frequently in the 2010s to differentiate it from the sequel series that followed.

The series was first broadcast by the Public Broadcasting Service in 1980, and was the most widely watched series in the history of American public television until The Civil War (1990). As of 2009, it was still the most widely watched PBS series in the world. It won two Emmys and a Peabody Award, and has since been broadcast in more than 60 countries and seen by over 500 million people. A book was also published to accompany the series.

Cosmos: A Personal Voyage has been considered highly significant since its broadcast; David Itzkoff of The New York Times described it as "a watershed moment for science-themed television programming".

Overview

Cosmos was produced in 1978 and 1979 by Los Angeles PBS member station KCET on a roughly $6.3 million budget, with over $2 million additionally allocated to promotion. The program's format is similar to earlier BBC documentaries such as Kenneth Clark's Civilisation, Jacob Bronowski's The Ascent of Man, and David Attenborough's Life on Earth. However, unlike those series, which were shot entirely on film, Cosmos used videotape for interior scenes and special effects, with film being used for exteriors and location shooting (this film-video hybrid format was common in British scripted television at the time, but less so in documentary productions). The BBC—a co-producer of Cosmos—later screened the series, but the episodes were cut to fit 50-minute slots.

The series is notable for its groundbreaking use of special effects, which allow Sagan to seemingly walk through environments that are actually models rather than full-sized sets. The soundtrack includes pieces of music provided by Greek composer Vangelis, such as Alpha, Pulstar, and Heaven and Hell Part 1 (the last movement serves as the signature theme music for the show, and is directly referenced by the title of the fourth episode). Throughout the 13 hours of the series, many tracks from several 1970s albums are used, such as Albedo 0.39, Meddle, Spiral, Ignacio, Beaubourg, and China. The worldwide success of the documentary series put Vangelis' music in the homes of many, and brought it to the attention of a global audience.

Turner Home Entertainment purchased Cosmos from series producer KCET in 1989. In making the move to commercial television, the hour-long episodes were edited to shorter lengths, and Sagan shot new epilogues for several episodes, in which he discussed new discoveries—and alternative viewpoints—that had arisen since the original broadcast. A 14th episode, consisting of an interview between Sagan and Ted Turner, was also produced. This new version of the series was eventually released as a VHS box set. This same re-edited version was also released on 12" LaserDisc. Two episodes were released per disc, one episode on each side. The LaserDiscs for the various episodes were sold separately, not in a boxed set (as was done for VHS).

Cosmos was unavailable for many years after its initial release because of copyright issues with the soundtrack music, but when it was released in 2000 on worldwide NTSC DVD, subtitles in seven languages and remastered 5.1 sound were included, as well as an alternative music and sound effects track. In 2005, The Science Channel rebroadcast the series for its 25th anniversary, with updated computer graphics and film footage, digital sound, and information about relevant scientific discoveries in the intervening 25 years. Despite being shown again on the Science Channel, the total amount of time for the original 13 episodes (780 minutes) was reduced 25% to 585 minutes (45 minutes per episode) in order to make room for commercials.

In a 2009 UK release, Fremantle Media Enterprises digitally restored and remastered the original series as a five-disc DVD set which included bonus science updates.

Episodes

Ted Turner Interviews Carl Sagan
Some versions of the series, including the first North American home video release (though not the DVD release), included a specially-made fourteenth episode, which consisted of an hour-long interview between Sagan and Ted Turner, in which the two discussed the series and new discoveries made in the years since its first broadcast.

Special edition

The 1986 special edition of Cosmos features new computer animated sequences and filmed segments with Sagan, as well as new narration. It includes content from Sagan's book Comet and discussion of his theory of nuclear winter; this material was not used in subsequent television or home video releases. The special edition premiered as one marathon program on the TBS network, and was later broadcast in Japan, Germany, Australia, Singapore, and Argentina. It is much shorter than the original version, at four and a half hours, divided into six 45-minute episodes:
 Other Worlds, Part 1
 Other Worlds, Part 2
 Children of the Stars, Part 1
 Children of the Stars, Part 2
 Message from the Sky, Part 1
 Message from the Sky, Part 2

The 1986 version of Cosmos contains a mix of music used in the original version, with a unique soundtrack composed by Vangelis specifically for the special edition. The score is often referred to as Comet, as "Comet 16" is used during the opening and closing credits of each episode. Of the 21 cues, "Comet 16" is the only one that has been officially released, although some of the new music appears in the 2000 remastered DVD release.

Music of Cosmos

LP and cassette
In 1981, a soundtrack LP was released by RCA Records shortly after the series' airing, which included the signature theme "Movement 3" (from "Symphony to the Powers B" from the album Heaven and Hell) by Greek synthesist and composer Vangelis (catalog No. ABL 1–4003 and TMS-50061; both also released on cassette tape).

Side A
Space / Time Continuum
"Movement 3" (from "Symphony to the Powers B" from the album Heaven and Hell) – Vangelis
"Symphony No.11 In G Minor ('The Year 1905'), Op.103: The Palace Square (Adagio)" – Dmitri Shostakovich (Performed by the Helsinki Philharmonic Orchestra)
"Alpha" (from the album Albedo 0.39)– Vangelis
Life
"(Depicting) Cranes In Their Nest" – Goro Yamaguchi
"Pachelbel's Canon" – Johann Pachelbel (Performed by James Galway)
"The Four Seasons: Spring" – Antonio Vivaldi
"The Sea Named 'Solaris' (BWV 788)" – Johann Sebastian Bach (Performed by Isao Tomita)
The Harmony of Nature
"Partita For Violin Solo No. 3 In E, BWV 1006" – Johann Sebastian Bach (Performed by Arthur Grumiaux)
Side B
Exploration
"'Vishnu Symphony No. 19, Op. 217" – Alan Hovhaness
"Legacy" – Larry Fast
"Russian Easter Festival Overture" – Nikolai Rimsky-Korsakov (Performed by Seattle Symphony)
"Inside The Heart Of The Universe" – Toru Takemitsu
Cataclism
"Fly...Night Bird" – Roy Buchanan
"Beaubourg, Part 2" – Vangelis
"The Rite of Spring" – Igor Stravinsky (Performed by Swedish Radio Symphony Orchestra)
Affirmation
"Entends-Tu Les Chiens Aboyer?" – Vangelis
"Izlel ye Delyo Haydutin" – Traditional (Performed by Valya Balkanska)
"Heaven & Hell, Part I" – Vangelis

CD
In 1994, RCA Records reissued the original soundtrack compilation on compact disc and, in 2002, reissued it on its Collectables label (RCA 07863 54003-2 USA; Collectables COL-CD-6293 USA). In 2002, a special two-disc "collector's edition" of music from the series was released to coincide with the DVD reissue, containing complete versions of many of the songs from the series only available as snippets on previous releases.

Collector's Edition
Disc One
"Heaven & Hell, Part I" – Vangelis (4:09)
"The Year 1905" – Dmitri Shostakovich (Performed by Helsinki Philharmonic) (5:38)
"Alpha" – Vangelis (5:42)
"(Depicting) Cranes In Their Nest" – Goro Yamaguchi (1:00)
"Clarinet Concerto in A Major, K. 622" – Wolfgang Amadeus Mozart (Performed by Mostly Mozart Orchestra) (7:53)
"Pachelbel's Canon" – Johann Pachelbel (Performed by James Galway) (5:08)
"Metamorphosis" – Jeffrey Boydstun (3:34)
"The Sea Named 'Solaris' (BWV 788)" – Johann Sebastian Bach (Performed by Isao Tomita) (6:04)
"Partita For Violin Solo No. 3 In E, BWV 1006" – Johann Sebastian Bach (Performed by Arthur Grumiaux) (2:53)
"The Four Seasons: Spring" – Antonio Vivaldi (3:21)
"Sonata C-Dur Für Trompete, Oboe, Und Basso Continuo" – Gottfried Finger (Performed by Leipziger Bach-Collegium) (1:21)
"Concerto For Mandolin & Strings In C Major" – Antonio Vivaldi (2:34)
"The Tale of Tsar Saltan" – Nikolai Rimsky-Korsakov (6:35)
"Legacy" – Larry Fast (5:47)
"Russian Easter Festival Overture" – Nikolai Rimsky-Korsakov (Performed by Seattle Symphony) (7:44)
Disc Two
"Pulstar" – Vangelis (5:13)
"'Vishnu Symphony No. 19, Op. 217" – Alan Hovhaness (4:02)
"Melancholy Blues" – Louis Armstrong And His Hot Seven (2:59)
"Aquarius – Hair (Original Off-Broadway Cast Recording) (3:56)
"Beaubourg, Part 2" – Vangelis (3:14)
"The Planets: Mars" – Gustav Holst (Performed by Saint Louis Symphony Orchestra) (7:09)
"Alien Images 1" – Jeff Boydstun (3:24)
"Fly...Night Bird" – Roy Buchanan (7:43)
"Entends-Tu Les Chiens Aboyer?" – Vangelis (2:50)
"The Rite of Spring" – Igor Stravinsky (Performed by Swedish Radio Symphony Orchestra) (10:31)
"Prayer of St. Gregory" – Alan Hovhaness (Performed by Seattle Symphony) (4:45)
"Izlel ye Delyo Haydutin" – Traditional (Performed by Valya Balkanska) (5:01)
"Comet 16" – Vangelis (3:48) (Only the special edition of Cosmos)

Singles
The main theme, titled Heaven and Hell, Part 1, but edited from Heaven and Hell Part 1 3rd Movement, was released in the UK as an edited 7" single by BBC Records (Cat No: BBC1). The 7" single did not have the quiet keyboard intro to be found on the full Vangelis LP version originally released in 1975. The B-side of the 7" single was an edited version of Alpha, taken from the Vangelis LP Albedo 0.39.
 1981 Heaven and Hell / Alpha RCA 71 UK
 1981 Heaven and Hell / Alpha BBC 1
 1981 Theme from the TV-series COSMOS / Alpha PB 5356 Holland
 1981 Titelmelodie aus der TV-Serie "Unser Kosmos" / Alpha PB 5356 West-Germany

Sequel series

On August 5, 2011, plans were announced for a sequel to the series, bringing up-to-date special effects and scientific discoveries to the themes and messages of the original series. The new 13-part series, referred to as Cosmos: A Spacetime Odyssey, was originally announced to premiere in the 2012–13 United States network television schedule, but a Twitter update from Neil deGrasse Tyson in June 2012 indicated an early 2014 release. Episodes began airing March 9, 2014 on the Fox Network and the next day on National Geographic Channel. The new series was hosted by astrophysicist Neil deGrasse Tyson and produced by the two surviving original creators, Ann Druyan and Steven Soter, with Seth MacFarlane. Another sequel series from the same team (with Tyson again hosting), Cosmos: Possible Worlds, premiered on March 9, 2020, on National Geographic.

References

External links

 The Carl Sagan Portal
 
 The Music of Cosmos: A Look at The Music of Vangelis Papathanassiou
 A Complete List of the Cosmos Soundtrack Music, based on the original cue sheets
 Cosmos DVD review on VideoVista

1980 American television series debuts
1980 American television series endings
1980s American documentary television series
Astronomy education television series
Documentary television series about astronomy
Documentary television series about science
PBS original programming
Peabody Award-winning television programs
Television series featuring reenactments
Works by Carl Sagan